Nikolai Grigorievich Lishin was a Russian Captain 1st Rank of the Russo-Japanese War and World War I. He commanded the General-Admiral Apraksin during the Battle of Tsushima and suffered an arrest of 4 years after surrendering the ship.

Biography
Nikolai was born on September 30, 1856 into a noble family from the Kherson Governorate as his parents were Lieutenant-General Grigory Nikolaevich Lishin and his wife Antonina Nikolaevna (née Erdeli). On September 15, 1872, Lishin attended the Naval Cadet Corps and graduated as a Gardes de la Marine on May 1, 1876 and promoted to Michman on August 30, 1877. He then partook in the Russo-Turkish War while serving in the Black Sea Fleet and made a part of the 5th Naval Crew on January 2, 1880. On October 21, 1881, Lishin took courses at the Training Artillery Detachment to become a senior artillery officer and was promoted to Lieutenant on January 1, 1882. He also received his first command as he commanded the 3rd company of the monitor Rusalka as well as beginning to teach courses on artillery and command. By May 30, 1884, he was the battery commander of the frigate General-Admiral, head of the galvanic firing instruments of the ship on September 30, 1885 and commander of the second company on January 17, 1886.

From June 1, 1886 to April 8, 1888, he was an artillery officer aboard the Petr Veliky and later, the senior officer on October 13, 1888 but was then transferred to become the senior officer of the Vladimir Monomakh on May 8, 1889. From May 31, 1891 to April 12, 1892, he was the flagship artillery officer within the headquarters of the Pacific Squadron before being assigned to the Veschun on January 1, 1893 and began focusing on the shipbuilding and mines of the ship on May 21, 1893. Lishin was then transferred to the Imperator Aleksandr II from January 1, 1894 to 1896 while also being promoted to Captain 2nd Rank on April 17, 1894. On May 9, 1896, he was made acting commander of the Artelshchik port and was given command of the Korietz. After briefly attending the Nikolaev Naval Academy, he graduated on 1896 and made the senior officer of the Admiral Kornilov on July 29, 1896. Beginning in 1897, he returned to command the Veshun, the gunboat Sneg on September 22, 1897 and the gunboat Dozhd on December 6, 1897. From December 6, 1898 to 1899, he commanded the Groza and was transferred to the Voivoda from December 6, 1899 to 1901. 

Lishin then commanded the Admiral Greig from December 6, 1901 to December 17, 1902 and was promoted to Captain 1st Rank in the same year. After given command of the on General-Admiral Apraksin on April 6, 1903, he took the ship to participate in the Battle of Tsushima but surrendered the ship during the battle. After being released, Lishin was stripped of all his ranks and awards and arrested at Saint Petersburg on August 22, 1905. He was initially supposed to serve 10 years in prison and potentially even death but he was pardoned by Nikolai II on May 1, 1909. After initially retiring in 1912, Lishin re-enlisted for service following the Russian entry into World War I as a volunteer. He served as a fireworksman of the 2nd division of the 4th Heavy Artillery Brigade. In 1915, during the inspection, Emperor Nikolai II noticed a gray-bearded soldier with awards for bravery and, having learned who it was, restored all of his awards and Lishin was promoted back to Captain 1st Rank. On August 17, 1915, was placed back in the 2nd Baltic Naval Crew. The Maritime magazine later wrote of this experience, describing it as:

He was transferred to the Black Sea Fleet on September 22, 1915 and from November 1915 to September 1916, he served as the head of the operational sect of the rear of the Black Sea Fleet. On October 29, 1916, he commanded Transport No. 81 (Equator). After the Russian Civil War broke out, Lishin served in the White Army but after the defeat of the Army, he and his wife fled from Novorossiysk on March 20, 1920 aboard Burgermeister Schroeder and settled in Yugoslavia in Spring 1921, dying at Požarevac.

Awards
War with Turkey (1877-78) Commemorative Medal 
Order of Saint Stanislaus, II Class (1895) 
Order of Saint Anna, II Class (December 6, 1901) 
Order of Saint Vladimir, IV Class (1903) for 20 companies under his command 
Cross of St. George (awarded 4 times)

References

1856 births
1923 deaths
People from Kherson Governorate
Imperial Russian Navy officers
Russian military personnel of the Russo-Turkish War (1877–1878)
Russian military personnel of the Russo-Japanese War
Russian military personnel of World War I
White movement people
White Russian emigrants to Yugoslavia
Recipients of the Order of St. Anna, 2nd class
Recipients of the Order of St. Vladimir, 4th class
Recipients of the Order of Saint Stanislaus (Russian), 2nd class
Prisoners and detainees of Russia
Prisoners of war held by Japan
Naval Cadet Corps alumni